Alberta Wilderness Association (AWA) is a Calgary, Alberta-based province-wide organization established in the 1968 in Lundbreck, Alberta, devoted to protecting the province's wilderness. By 2020, AWA had over 7,000 members and supporters.

Background
When the Alberta Wilderness Association, was formed in 1968 in southwestern rural Alberta, it was the first wilderness conservation group in the province that was dedicated to conserving and protecting Alberta's wilderness. By 1965, a small group of back-country enthusiasts—including Floyd and Karen Stromstedt, Marian and Bill Michalsky, and Steve and Helen Dixon—raised concerns in meetings with "local farmers, teachers and community leaders", that Alberta's official "multiple-use" land policy, was "destroying, not preserving" Alberta's "public land wild spaces". In Lundbreck, Alberta in 1968, thirty-four people officially formed the Alberta Wilderness Association with. William (Willie) Michalsky, a "local outfitter and rancher" was elected as the Association's first president.

In the 1960s, Stromstedt would hunt sheep hunter in the Foothills. He had become concerned by the "growing encroachment of industrialization" in the wilderness. Bill Michalsky and Steve Dixon shared his concerns. In an April 1971 letter, Stromstedt described how the AWA had attracted 900 members—"some who love horses, some who hate horses; some who hunt, some who hate hunters; some who fish, some who do not fish; some who backpack, some who prefer day hikes; some who paint pictures, some who take photographs; some lone wolves, some with five children; some church leaders, some Girl Guides; some ranchers, some urbanites; and on and on, ad infinitum."

The AWA publishes the Wild Lands Advocate and Ian Urquhart is the current editor.

Supporters
By 2020, AWA had over 7,000 supporters including Calgary Hitmen Hockey Club, Heritage Park Historical Village, Royal Tyrrell Museum, Telus Spark, the Calgary Flames, Calgary Zoo, and Government of Alberta Culture and Tourism.

Advocacy and research
The AWA monitors and advocates for the protection of aquatic species in Alberta that are listed under the federal government's  Species at Risk Act (SARA), such as the threatened bull trout—popular in sport fishing in Alberta and Alberta's Athabasca rainbow trout, which is on SARA's proposed list of endangered aquatic species. 

In January 2019, the AWA joined with the David Suzuki Foundation, and Athabasca Chipewyan First Nation to file an application for an emergency protection order for five caribou herds in northeastern Alberta. The application made by Ecojustice, on their behalf, was based on the federal Species At Risk Act and on two federal studies by the federal government, that found that "critical habitat for boreal caribou was not being adequately protected in any province." Ecojustice discontinued the case when the federal government announced its new protection plan.

In an October 23, 2020 interview with APTN National News, AWA's Ian Urquhart warned Benga Mining Limited's proposed Grassy Mountain Coal Project, a 2,800-hectare mountain top removal open-pit metallurgical coal minenear Crowsnest Pass, would "decapitate Grassy Mountain".

Charity Intelligence ranking

In 2020, the AWA was included on Charity Intelligence Canada's list of the 2020 Top 100 Rated Charities in Canada with an A rating.

References

See also
 List of advocacy groups in Canada
Environmental organizations based in Alberta
Organizations based in Calgary
Nature conservation organizations based in Canada
1968 establishments in Alberta